A Twenty20 International (T20I) is a form of cricket, played between two of the international members of the International Cricket Council (ICC), in which each team faces a maximum of twenty overs. The matches have top-class status and are the highest T20 standard. The game is played under the rules of Twenty20 cricket. The first Twenty20 International match between two men's sides was played on 17 February 2005, involving Australia and New Zealand. Wisden Cricketers' Almanack reported that "neither side took the game especially seriously", and it was noted by ESPNcricinfo that but for a large score for Ricky Ponting, "the concept would have shuddered". However, Ponting himself said "if it does become an international game then I'm sure the novelty won't be there all the time".
This is a list of Zimbabwe Cricket team's Twenty20 International records. It is based on the List of Twenty20 International records, but concentrates solely on records dealing with the Zimbabwe cricket team. Zimbabwe played the first ever T20I in 2006.

Key
The top five records are listed for each category, except for the team wins, losses, draws and ties, all round records and the partnership records. Tied records for fifth place are also included. Explanations of the general symbols and cricketing terms used in the list are given below. Specific details are provided in each category where appropriate. All records include matches played for Zimbabwe only, and are correct .

Team records

Overall Record

Team wins, losses, draws and ties 
, Zimbabwe has played 96 T20I matches resulting in 24 victories, 70 defeats, 2 ties and 0 no results for an overall winning percentage of 26.04.

First bilateral T20I series wins

First T20I match wins

Team scoring records

Most runs in an innings

Fewest runs in an innings

Most runs conceded an innings

Fewest runs conceded in an innings

Most runs aggregate in a match

Fewest runs aggregate in a match

Result records

Greatest win margins (by runs)

Greatest win margins (by balls remaining)

Greatest win margins (by wickets)

Highest successful run chases

Narrowest win margins (by runs)

Narrowest win margins (by balls remaining)

Narrowest win margins (by wickets)

Greatest loss margins (by runs)

Greatest loss margins (by balls remaining)

Greatest loss margins (by wickets)

Narrowest loss margins (by runs)

Narrowest loss margins (by balls remaining)

Narrowest loss margins (by wickets)

Tied matches

Individual records

Batting records

Most career runs

Most runs in each batting position

Highest individual score

Highest individual score – progression of record

Highest score against each opponent

Highest career average

Highest Average in each batting position

Most half-centuries

Most Sixes

Most Fours

Highest strike rates

Highest strike rates in an inning

Most runs in a calendar year

Most runs in a series

Most ducks

Bowling records

Most career wickets

Best figures in an innings

Best figures in an innings – progression of record

Best Bowling Figure against each opponent

Best career average

Best career economy rate

Best career strike rate

Most four-wickets (& over) hauls in an innings

Best economy rates in an inning

Best strike rates in an inning

Worst figures in an innings

Most runs conceded in a match

Most wickets in a calendar year

Most wickets in a series

Wicket-keeping records

Most career dismissals

Most career catches

Most career stumpings

Most dismissals in an innings

Most dismissals in a series

Fielding records

Most career catches

Most catches in an innings

Most catches in a series

Other records

Most career matches

Most consecutive career matches

Most matches as captain

Most matches won as a captain

Youngest players on Debut

Oldest Players on Debut

Oldest Players

Partnership records

Highest partnerships by wicket

Highest partnerships by runs

Umpiring records

Most matches umpired

See also

List of Twenty20 International records
List of Test cricket records
List of Cricket World Cup records
List of One Day International cricket records

References

Zimbabwean cricket lists
Zimbabwe in international cricket